Sankt Pantaleon-Erla is a town in the district of Amstetten in Lower Austria in Austria.

Geography
St. Pantaleon-Erla lies on the west border of Upper Austria in the Mostviertel east of the confluence of the Enns Canal and the Danube. About 27.37 percent of the municipality is forested.

References

Cities and towns in Amstetten District